The women's 400 metres at the 1958 European Athletics Championships was held in Stockholm, Sweden, at Stockholms Olympiastadion on 19 and 21 August 1958. This was the first time that women competed in the 400 metres at the European Championships.

Medalists

Results

Final
21 August

Heats
19 August

Heat 1

Heat 2

Participation
According to an unofficial count, 12 athletes from 8 countries participated in the event.

 (1)
 (1)
 (1)
 (1)
 (3)
 (1)
 (3)
 (1)

References

400 metres
400 metres at the European Athletics Championships
Euro